UFC 32: Showdown in the Meadowlands was a mixed martial arts event held by the Ultimate Fighting Championship at the Continental Airlines Arena in East Rutherford, New Jersey on June 29, 2001.

History
The card was headlined by the first Light Heavyweight Championship Bout (previously called "Middleweight") between Tito Ortiz and Elvis Sinosic.

The event also featured the first appearance of future Heavyweight Champion Ricco Rodriguez.

UFC 32 marked the last appearances of long time commentator Jeff Blatnick, who had been with the UFC since UFC 4 as well as Frank Shamrock, who had been commentating for the UFC as well after retiring his promotional Light Heavyweight championship.

The event poster shows the towers of the World Trade Center in the background. Less than 3 months after the event, they were destroyed in the September 11 attacks.

The event was seen live on pay per view in the United States, and later released on home video.

Results

See also 
 Ultimate Fighting Championship
 List of UFC champions
 List of UFC events
 2001 in UFC

External links
 Official UFC website

Ultimate Fighting Championship events
2001 in mixed martial arts
Mixed martial arts in New Jersey
Sports competitions in East Rutherford, New Jersey
2001 in sports in New Jersey
Events in East Rutherford, New Jersey